Beastie Boys Anthology may refer to:

Beastie Boys Anthology: The Sounds of Science - audio anthology composed of greatest hits, B-sides, and previously-unreleased tracks
Beastie Boys Video Anthology - a 2000 DVD compilation of video clips